Jay Christopher Zainey (born July 7, 1951) is a United States district judge of the United States District Court for the Eastern District of Louisiana.

Education and career

Born in New Orleans, Louisiana, Zainey was a member of the United States Air Force Reserve from 1970 to 1976. During this time he received a Bachelor of Science degree from the University of New Orleans in 1972 and a Juris Doctor from the Paul M. Hebert Law Center at Louisiana State University in 1975, and was a law clerk to a private practice in Louisiana from 1974 to 1975. He was then an attorney in private practice in Louisiana from 1976 to 2002.

District court service

On October 10, 2001, Zainey was nominated by President George W. Bush to a seat on the United States District Court for the Eastern District of Louisiana vacated by A. J. McNamara. Zainey was confirmed by the United States Senate on February 11, 2002, and received commission on February 14, 2002.

References

Sources

1951 births
Living people
University of New Orleans alumni
Louisiana State University Law Center alumni
Judges of the United States District Court for the Eastern District of Louisiana
United States district court judges appointed by George W. Bush
21st-century American judges
United States Air Force airmen
People from New Orleans
United States Air Force reservists